Blessed Bertha de Bardi (died 24 March 1163) was born in Florence. She was the daughter of Lothario di Ugo, Count of Vernio, and is ordinarily called Bertha de Bardi, but the name should probably be d'Alberti. She joined the order of Vallombrosa, a branch of the Benedictines, at Florence, but she was soon sent to govern and reform a convent of the order at Cavriglia in Valdarno, where she lived, famous for miracles until her death.

References

Sources
 Soldani, "Vita di S. Berta", Florence, 1731.

1163 deaths
Italian beatified people
Year of birth unknown